Parduymn Rajput (born 12 July 1963) is an Indian Politician and a leader of Bharatiya Janata Party. In Fifth Delhi Assembly, he served as a member of the Delhi Legislative Assembly from Dwarka constituency.

References

1963 births
Delhi MLAs 2013–2015
Living people
Place of birth missing (living people)
Members of the Delhi Legislative Assembly
Bharatiya Janata Party politicians from Delhi
Date of birth missing (living people)